The FTSE Fledgling Index comprises companies listed on the main market of the London Stock Exchange (LSE) which qualify as eligible for inclusion in the FTSE UK series but are too small to be included in the FTSE All-Share Index. There is no liquidity requirement for constituents of the FTSE Fledgling Index.

This Index is calculated on an end-of-day basis.

ICB Supersector Breakdown 
The ICB Supersector Breakdown as of November 2015 was as follows:

See also 
FTSE 100
FTSE 250

References

FTSE Group stock market indices
British stock market indices